Édouard-Théodore Nicole (12 January 1820 – 19 February 1900), known as Léonce, was a 19th-century French actor and singer.

Biography 
Léonce was born in Paris.  After studying law, he made his stage debut at the Théâtre de Belleville. He also played the cello.

In the 1850s, he was engaged at the Théâtre des Bouffes-Parisiens by Jacques Offenbach and sang many roles in the works of Offenbach and Hervé.  After some time at the Théâtre de l'Athenée, he played in the premieres of Tromb-al-ca-zar, Croquefer, Orphée aux Enfers, Mesdames de la Halle and Monsieur Choufleuri. For several years, he appeared at the Théâtre des Variétés including in Les brigands, Le docteur Ox, La Vie parisienne and La Périchole.

After an unwise investment in a café, he ended his life in poverty.  He died at Raincy on 19 February 1900.

Theatre 
 Comedian-singer

1858: Mesdames de la Halle, une opérette bouffe de Jacques Offenbach  - created on 3 March 1858 at the Théâtre des Bouffes-Parisiens (salle Choiseul) - as Madame Poiretapée, poissonnière 
1858: Orphée aux Enfers, opéra-bouffe by Jacques Offenbach - created on 21 October at the Théâtre des Bouffes-Parisiens -  as Aristée-Pluton -
1859: L'Omelette à la Follembuche, operetta bouffe by Eugène Labiche and Marc-Michel - created on 8 June at the Théâtre des Bouffes-Parisiens - as La baronne de Follembuche 
1861: M. Choufleuri restera chez lui le . . ., opéra bouffe by Jacques Offenbach - created on 14 September 1861 at the Théâtre des Bouffes Parisiens - as Mme Balandard
1865: Les bergers, opéra-comique by Jacques Offenbach - as the Marquis
1869: Les brigands, opéra bouffe by Jacques Offenbach - created at the Théâtre des Variétés on 10 December - as Antonio, caissier du duc de Mantoue
1873: Les Braconniers, opéra bouffe by Jacques Offenbach - created at the Théâtre des Variétés on 29 January - as Bibès, veux braconnier
1875: Les Trente Millions de Gladiator, comédie en vaudeville by Eugène Labiche and Philippe Gille - created at Théâtre des Variétés on 22 January - as Pepitt 
1875: La boulangère a des écus, opéra bouffe by Jacques Offenbach - created on 19| October 1875 at the Théâtre des Variétés - as Délicat 
1876: Le roi dort by Eugène Labiche and Alfred Delacour - created on 31 March at the Théâtre des Variétés - as Bec de miel
1877: Le docteur Ox, opéra-bouffe by Jacques Offenbach - created on 26 January at the Théâtre des Variétés - as Ygène 
1883: Mam'zelle Nitouche, operetta by Henri Meilhac and Albert Millaud - created on 26 January at the Théâtre des Variétés - as Loriot, "brigadier"

 Author
1859: Dans la rue, operetta by Léonce (lyricist) - Théâtre des Bouffes-Parisiens - created on 8 September

References

Sources 
 Gänzl Kurt. The Encyclopedia of the Musical Theatre. Blackwell, Oxford, 1994.
 This article incorporates some material re-edited from French Wikipedia

1820 births
1900 deaths
19th-century French male opera singers
Male actors from Paris
19th-century French male actors